Frank Zoppetti (April 16, 1916 – October 3, 2009) was an American football running back for the Pittsburgh Steelers for one season, in 1941. He was also a quarterback in college for Duquesne. He played in four games. Zoppetti died on October 3, 2009 at the age of 93.

References

1916 births
2009 deaths
Players of American football from Pennsylvania
Pittsburgh Steelers players
People from Butler County, Pennsylvania
American football running backs
Duquesne Dukes football players